Stylidium perizostera is a dicotyledonous plant that belongs to the genus Stylidium (family Stylidiaceae). It is an annual plant that grows from 5 to 11 cm tall. The linear leaves, about 8–12 per plant, are mostly in terminal rosettes but with some scattered along the elongate, glabrous stem. The leaves are around 7.5 mm long and 0.4-0.7 mm wide. Petioles are absent. This species produces 1-10 scapes per plant. Inflorescences are around 9 cm long and produce a single white, yellow, and orange flower. S. perizostera is endemic to the Kimberley region in Western Australia and ranges from the Mitchell Plateau to Bigge Island. Its habitat is recorded as being near sandstone outcrops in drainage lines.

See also 
 List of Stylidium species

References 

Carnivorous plants of Australia
Eudicots of Western Australia
perizostera
Asterales of Australia